Bulgaria competed at the 2022 World Aquatics Championships in Budapest, Hungary from 17 June to 3 July.

Swimming

Bulgaria entered eight swimmers.

Men

Women

References

World Aquatics Championships
2022
Nations at the 2022 World Aquatics Championships